Wilhelmus Demarteau, M.S.F.  (24 January 1917 – 5 December 2012) was a Dutch prelate of the Roman Catholic Church. He was one of the oldest Roman Catholic bishops and Dutch bishops.

Demarteau was born in Horn, Netherlands and ordained a priest on 27 July 1941 for the Congregation of Missionaries of the Holy Family. Demarteau was appointed Vicar Apostolic of the Diocese of Banjarmasin on 6 January 1954 along with Titular Bishop of Arsinoë in Cypro and was consecrated bishop on 5 May 1954. He was appointed bishop of the Diocese of Banjarmasin and served until his resignation on 6 June 1983. Demarteau died on 5 December 2012 in Suaka Insan Hospital (Rumah Sakit Suaka Insan:Indonesian)

See also
Diocese of Banjarmasin

References

External links
Wilhelmus Demarteau at catholic-hierarchy.org

1917 births
2012 deaths
20th-century Roman Catholic bishops in Indonesia
20th-century Dutch Roman Catholic priests
Participants in the Second Vatican Council
People from Leudal
Dutch emigrants to Indonesia